The La Spezia Black Eagles are a lacrosse team based in La Spezia, Italy. They are one of the first teams from Italy, along with the Rome Lions. The president and coach of the team is Roberto Pallotti.

References

External links
La Spezia Black Eagles Official Website 

Lacrosse teams in Europe
Lacrosse in Italy
Sports teams in Italy
La Spezia